Kenneth Hunter may refer to:
 Kenneth Hunter (physician), Scottish consultant physician
 Kenneth Hunter (cricketer), English cricketer and stockbroker
 Kenneth Adams Hunter, Canadian Surgeon General
 Ken Hunter, Australian rules football player
 Kenny Hunter, Scottish sculptor